Top surgery refers to the surgical procedures on the breasts:

Mammaplasty
Breast augmentation surgery
Breast reduction surgery
Mastectomy
Gender-affirming surgery
Gender-affirming surgery (female-to-male), may include bilateral mastectomy and male chest reconstruction
Gender-affirming surgery (male-to-female), may include breast augmentation

See also
Bottom surgery